You Xian Ku (Chinese: 遊仙窟) is a famous Chinese story from the "Legends of the Tang Dynasty" (唐人傳奇) written by Zhang Zhuo (張鷟). In English, its title roughly translates as "Journey to the Fairy Grotto."

The Story 
Zhang Zhuo (Chinese: 張鷟, born 658－730 CE), bestowed the honorary name of Wen Cheng (文成), was a Tang Dynasty Jinshi, a former imperial censor (御史), and a native of Luze, Shenzhou (now Shenxian 深縣 county, Hebei province).

"You Xian Ku" is a story of the author's first-hand account visiting Heyuan (now Qinghai, Xinghai province), passing through Jishi (積石) mountain. "The days turn to nights, and the road is far. The horse is weary and the man tired" (日晚途遙，馬疲人乏). He stayed in the fairy grotto and met two women by chance: Cui Shi Niang (崔十娘) and Wu Sao (五嫂), a widow. There they drank wine, wrote poetry, and joked around. 

The entire text is written in Four-Six Pianwen (parallel prose), mixed with Bianwen, with rhymes and leisurely in style. Shi Niang writes vividly and lively [note: since translating poetry is harder and takes more time, this will be left in its original Chinese until updated]:

天上無雙，人間有一。 

依依弱柳，束作腰支；

焰焰橫波，翻成眼尾。

才舒兩頰，孰疑地上無華；

乍出雙眉，漸覺天邊失月。”

Some people called it a "new form of novel" (新體小說).

"You Xian Ku" is the Tang Dynasty's earliest romance novel, based on the wanton lives of prostitutes first met by Tang scholars. It has had a profound influence on the love stories written by later generations. Although "You Xian Ku" had been lost in China for over a millennia, its popularity in Japan has never ceased. According to the Old Book of Tang, every time Japan sent an envoy to china during the Tang dynasty, they had to pay a lot to buy copies of the book. In the late Qing dynasty, the book was copied, reprinted in Japan and sent back to China.

In Bai Xianyong's (白先勇) novel "Crystal Boys" the chapter "Journey to the Goblin Cave" (You Yao Ku, 遊妖窟) is parodied off "You Xian Ku."

Also see 
 The Tale of Genji
 Chuanqi

Citations 

 李奭學：《人妖之間——從張鷟的〈遊仙窟〉看白先勇的〈孽子〉》，《中國文哲研究通訊》（中央研究院）第15卷第4期（2006年3月），頁135-150

7th-century books